Younan Nowzaradan (born October 11, 1944), also known as Dr. Now, is an Iranian-born American doctor, TV personality, and author. He specializes in vascular surgery and bariatric surgery. He is known for helping morbidly obese people lose weight on My 600-lb Life (2012–present).

Education and medical career
Nowzaradan was born and raised in Tehran, Iran, and is an Assyrian. In 1970, he graduated from the University of Tehran with a Doctor of Medicine degree. He then moved to the United States. He participated in the Medical Orientation Program at Saint Louis University in 1971 and completed a Rotating Surgical Internship at St. John Hospital (operated by St. John Providence Health System) in Detroit, Michigan. Nowzaradan is a fellow of the American College of Surgeons.

Nowzaradan is currently affiliated with Houston Obesity Surgery in Houston, TX and practices at several local hospitals.  He is  the author of several scholarly publications on obesity and laparoscopy. According to the Web of Science, he has published five papers.

Media appearances
He has been on My 600-lb Life since 2012. He has also appeared on installments of Body Shock, including the episodes "Half Ton Dad", "Half Ton Teen", and "Half Ton Mum". He also published two books titled Last Chance to Live (2017) and The Scale Does Not Lie, People Do (2019). Dr. Now made several appearances at Texas theme parks such as Six Flags Astroworld to promote health awareness in the early 2000s, reaching out to youth, encouraging them to make good dietary choices.

Personal life
He was married to Delores McRedmond for 27 years; they divorced in 2002. The couple had three children together. His son, Jonathan Nowzaradan (b. 1978), works as a director and producer for My 600-lb Life.

References

Bariatrics
American surgeons
American people of Iranian-Assyrian descent
University of Tehran alumni
Living people
1944 births
Iranian emigrants to the United States
Participants in American reality television series
People from Tehran
Iranian surgeons
20th-century Iranian people
21st-century Iranian people
20th-century American people
21st-century American people